The 1531 Lisbon earthquake occurred in the Kingdom of Portugal on the morning of 26 January 1531, between 4 and 5 o'clock.
The earthquake and subsequent tsunami resulted in approximately 30,000 deaths. Despite its severity, the disaster had been mostly forgotten until the rediscovery of contemporary records in the early 20th-century.

Event 

The earthquake is believed to have been caused by the Lower Tagus Fault Zone, and was preceded by a pair of foreshocks on 2 January and 7 January. Damage to the city, especially the downtown area, was severe: approximately one-third of structures in the city were destroyed and 1,000 lives were lost in the initial shock.

Contemporary reports tell of flooding near the Tagus River, ships being thrown onto rocks, and others grounded on the river's floor as the water retreated. Miranda et al. conclude that "these observations are coherent with the existence of a large change in the estuary seafloor, either tectonic displacement or a landslide."

Aftermath

The earthquake was followed by several strong aftershocks, and fear of another earthquake was intense. Mass hysteria accompanied by all-manner of religious demonstrations (donations, pilgrimages, sermons, etc.) were felt through the Kingdom. The events that followed are closely compared to those following the 1755 earthquake, from the King taking refuge in tents, in Palmela, to the religious and civil repercussions and the response of the State.

Quickly after the tremor rumors spread, apparently encouraged by the friars of Santarém, that the disaster was divine punishment (Latin: "Ira Dei"- Wrath of God) and that the Jewish community was to blame. Poet and playwright Gil Vicente, who was present in that city during the quake, reportedly personally defused the situation while scolding the friars for their fear-mongering in a powerfully written letter to King John III, and possibly averting a massacre of Jews and recent converts to Christianity.

Rediscovery

The 1531 earthquake, alongside the 1321 earthquake, had been largely forgotten until the early 20th century. In 1909, a Portuguese newspaper reported the discovery of an unsigned manuscript of eyewitness accounts of the disaster. In 1919, a four-page letter addressed to the Marquis of Tarifa was found in a Lisbon bookshop, which appeared to describe the earthquake. Sousa's 1919 investigation of the 1755 Lisbon earthquake provided more evidence for the 1531 event, particularly his compilation of answers to the Marquis of Pombal's survey in the wake of the 1755 disaster, which included a question about previous earthquakes.

See also
 List of historical earthquakes
 1761 Lisbon earthquake

Notes

Earthquakes in Portugal
History of Lisbon
Lisbon Earthquake, 1531
Lisbon
Lisbon